2,5-Dimethoxy-4-methylamphetamine (DOM; known as STP, standing for "Serenity, Tranquility and Peace") is a psychedelic and a substituted amphetamine. It was first synthesized by Alexander Shulgin, and later reported in his book PiHKAL: A Chemical Love Story.  DOM is classified as a Schedule I substance in the United States, and is similarly controlled in other parts of the world. Internationally, it is a Schedule I drug under the Convention on Psychotropic Substances.  It is generally taken orally.

History
STP was first synthesized and tested in 1963 by Alexander Shulgin, who was investigating the effect of 4-position substitutions on psychedelic amphetamines.

In mid-1967, tablets containing 20 mg (later 10 mg) of STP were widely distributed in the Haight-Ashbury District of San Francisco under the name of STP, having been manufactured by underground chemists Owsley Stanley and Tim Scully. This short-lived appearance of STP on the black market proved disastrous for several reasons.  First, the tablets contained an excessively high dose of the chemical. This, combined with DOM's slow onset of action (which encouraged some users, familiar with drugs that have quicker onsets, such as LSD, to re-dose) and its remarkably long duration, caused many users to panic and sent some to the emergency room. Second, treatment of such overdoses was complicated by the fact that no one at the time knew that the tablets called STP were, in fact, DOM.

Effects
Effects of this drug include substantial perceptual changes such as blurred vision, multiple images, vibration of objects, visual alterations, distorted shapes, enhancement of details, slowed passage of time, increased sexual drive and pleasure, and increased contrasts. It may cause mystical experiences and changes in consciousness. It may also cause pupillary dilation and a rise in systolic blood pressure.

Pharmacology 
DOM is a selective 5-HT2A, 5-HT2B, and 5-HT2C receptor partial agonist. Its psychedelic effects are mediated by its agonistic properties at the 5-HT2A receptor. Due to its selectivity, DOM is often used in scientific research when studying the 5-HT2 receptor subfamily.  DOM is a chiral molecule, and R-(−)-DOM is the more active enantiomer, functioning as a potent agonist of the serotonin 5-HT family of receptors; mainly of the 5-HT2 subtype.

Analogues and derivatives 

The 2,6-dimethoxy positional isomer of DOM, known as Ψ-DOM, is also mentioned in PiHKAL as being active, as is the alpha-ethyl homologue Ariadne. Analogues where the methoxy groups at the 2,5- positions of the aromatic ring have been altered have also been synthesised and tested as part of an effort to identify the binding mode of DOM at the 5-HT2A receptor. Both the 2- and 5- O-desmethyl derivatives 2-DM-DOM and 5-DM-DOM, and the 2- and 5- ethyl analogues 2-Et-DOM and 5-Et-DOM have been tested, but in all cases were significantly less potent than the corresponding methoxy compound, showing the importance of the oxygen lone pairs in 5-HT2A binding.

Toxicity
Very little is known about the toxicity of DOM. According to Alexander Shulgin, the effects of DOM typically last 14 to 20 hours, though other clinical trials indicate a duration of 7 to 8 hours.

Legal status

Canada
Listed as a Schedule 1, as it is an analogue of amphetamine.

United States
DOM is Schedule I in the United States. This means it is illegal to manufacture, buy, possess, or distribute (make, trade, own or give) without a DEA license.

Australia
DOM is schedule 9 under the Australia Poisons standard. A schedule 9 substance is a "Substances which may be abused or misused, the manufacture, possession, sale or use of which should be prohibited by law except when required for medical or scientific research, or for analytical, teaching or training purposes with approval of Commonwealth and/or State or Territory Health Authorities."

United Kingdom
DOM is a Class A drug in the United Kingdom under the Misuse of Drugs Act 1971.

See also 
 2,5-Dimethoxy-4-Substituted Amphetamines

References

External links
 DOM Entry in PiHKAL
 DOM Entry in PiHKAL • info
 Erowid DOM Vault

Serotonin receptor agonists
Substituted amphetamines
2,5-Dimethoxyphenethylamines
Designer drugs